Kim Winona (born Constance Elaine Mackey; October 10, 1930 – June 23, 1978), also credited as Connie Buck, was an American actress, mostly playing Native American roles in Western television programs.

Early life 
Winona was born Constance Elaine Mackey in South Sioux City, Nebraska, the daughter of Elmer Marion Mackey and Elaine Grace Garvie Mackey Melior. She lived on the Rosebud Indian Reservation in South Dakota, and in Spokane, Washington, as a girl. She was an enrolled member of the Santee Sioux people, and her mother was active in compiling records of Native American family trees.

Career 
Winona worked as a secretary and model when she first lived in Los Angeles. On television she had a regular role as Morning Star in Brave Eagle (1955–1956), of which she explained that "The script writers have never made me say 'Ugh', 'Me catchum this', or 'Me wantum wampum.'" The show was praised for casting several Native American actors in regular roles, and for having a Chippewa technical advisor. While in this role, she was a guest marshal of the Hesperia Days parade in Hesperia, California.

As Connie Buck, she also appeared in The Man Called X (1956), Bolt of Lightning (1957), Cheyenne (1958), The Rough Riders (1958), 26 Men (1957–1958), Northwest Passage (1959), Gunsmoke (1959), Black Saddle (1959), Bat Masterson (1960), and Rawhide (1959–1960). She had a role in the film Gun Fight (1961), and was hired to promote the film Apache (1954), despite not appearing in it. She also painted and did sculpture.

Personal life 
Winona married four times, and divorced three times. Her first husband was Harvey L. Buck; they married in 1949, in Spokane. Her third husband was John Gilbert Stewart; they married in 1972, in Los Angeles, and divorced in 1976. Her last husband was Charles Marcus "Chic" Sorenson; they married in 1977. She had two daughters, Migan (Mimi) Richmond and Michelle Stewart,  a young adult and supernatural thriller writer under the pen name Michelle Morningstar. Kim Winona died in 1978, aged 47 years, in Los Angeles.

References

External links 

 

1930 births
1978 deaths
People from South Sioux City, Nebraska
Native American actresses